Mitchinamecus may refer to:

 Zec Mitchinamecus, a controlled harvesting zone in Quebec, Canada
 Mitchinamecus River, in Quebec, Canada
Mitchinamecus Reservoir, on the Mitchinamecus River in Quebec, Canada